The Bursa Uludağ Gondola, or simply Teleferik as called locally, is an aerial lift line in Bursa Province connecting the city of Bursa with the nearby ski resort area and national park at Mt. Uludağ. Initially, as an aerial tramway line, it went in service in 1963, and served for fifty years until it was replaced by a modern system of gondola lift and extended into a ski resort area. The installation of a new line became unavoidable due to increased demand by tourists.

History
The initial line was an aerial tramway built by the Swiss company Von Roll Holding to enable easy access to the country's biggest ski resort area on Uludağ. Construction work began in 1958 and the line opened on 29 October 1963, the 40th anniversary Republic Day.

The base station is situated at Teferrüç neighborhood of Yıldırım district in southern Bursa. Two 20-seater cabins transported  hourly 120 passengers. The service of aerial tramway ceased on 29 October 2013, after fifty years, to make way for a modern and higher capacity aerial lift system.

New aerial lift
The new aerial lift line was designed, and all the technical equipment was delivered by the Italian company Leitner Ropeways on a build–operate–transfer financing base for a lease period of 30 years. The stations were designed by Yamaç Korfalı from Bursa, who had worked with the renowned Iraqi-British architect Zaha Hadid in London. The transportation of material and the support towers to the difficult accessible areas in the national park was done by an aerial crane of Heliswiss. The construction works were carried out by Bursa Teleferik Company.  

In the past, the hotels and the ski areas could be reached only by taxi or bus after arriving at the end station in Sarıalan Yaylası. There are also VIP cabins with four seats. The capacity of the new line is more than 10-times of the old one. The journey between the end stations takes 22 minutes. As such, it is the world's longest gondola lift line.

The opening, initially planned to take place on 29 October 2013, the 90th anniversary Republic Day, was postponed due to delay in construction works of a new bigger station building in Sarıalan Yaylası caused by a court order.

 Teferrüç, Bursa:  
 Kadıyayla, Uludağ:   
 Sarıalan Yaylası, Uludağ:  
 Oteller, Uludağ:

See also
 List of gondola lifts in Turkey

References

Transport in Bursa
Aerial tramways in Turkey
1963 establishments in Turkey
Transport infrastructure completed in 1963
2013 establishments in Turkey
Transport infrastructure completed in 2013
Tourist attractions in Bursa